Lac de Michelbach is a lake in Michelbach, Haut-Rhin, France. The reservoir serves as water supply for the city of Mulhouse.

Michelbach